Rowland Ap Meredydd (by 1529 – 1600 or later), of Bodowyr in Llanidan, Anglesey, was a Welsh politician.

He was a Member (MP) of the Parliament of England for Anglesey in 1558 and 1559.

References

17th-century deaths
16th-century Welsh politicians
People from Anglesey
Members of the Parliament of England (pre-1707) for constituencies in Wales
Year of birth uncertain
English MPs 1558
English MPs 1559